Eric Stokes (born December 18, 1973) is an American football executive for the Washington Commanders of the National Football League (NFL). Prior to becoming an executive, he played college football at Nebraska and was drafted by the Seattle Seahawks in the fifth round of the 1997 NFL Draft. He played safety for them for two seasons before being selected by the Cleveland Browns in the 1999 expansion draft before suffering an injury and retiring.

In 2000, Stokes rejoined the Seahawks as a scout and worked in other personnel roles with them for a decade. He held other executive roles with the Tampa Bay Buccaneers, Miami Dolphins, and Carolina Panthers throughout the 2010s. He was named director of pro personnel for Washington in 2020 before being promoted to senior director of player personnel the following year.

References

External links
Washington Commanders bio
Nebraska Cornhuskers bio

1973 births
Living people
American football cornerbacks
American football safeties
Nebraska Cornhuskers football players
Seattle Seahawks players
Seattle Seahawks executives
Tampa Bay Buccaneers executives
Miami Dolphins executives
Carolina Panthers executives
American football scouts
Washington Commanders executives
Washington Commanders scouts
Washington Football Team executives
Washington Football Team scouts
Sportspeople from Lincoln, Nebraska
Players of American football from Nebraska
Seattle Seahawks scouts
African-American players of American football
Tampa Bay Buccaneers scouts
Carolina Panthers scouts
African-American sports executives and administrators
21st-century African-American sportspeople
20th-century African-American sportspeople